Forest of the Martyrs (Ya'ar HaKdoshim)  is a forest on the outskirts of West Jerusalem, Israel. It is on the western edge of the Jerusalem Forest near Beit Meir. It was planted as a memorial to those who died in the Holocaust and contains six million trees, symbolizing the six million Jews who perished at the hands of the Nazis and their collaborators in World War II.

History
The first trees for the forest were planted in 1951. The World B'nai Brith Jewish service organization financed a significant portion of the planting of the trees by the Jewish National Fund.

In addition to the trees planted in the forest to commemorate the victims of the Holocaust, the forest contains several memorials:

  The Scroll of Fire, a large bronze sculpture by Nathan Rapoport, shaped like a double Torah scroll, one depicting scenes of destruction of the Jewish people in ancient and modern times, and the second depicting scenes of national rebirth.
  The Martyrs Cave, a natural cave that developed as a place of reflection and communion with the memory of Holocaust victims.
 The Anne Frank Memorial, a large cube depicting the annex in which the Frank family and others hid and a depiction of a chestnut tree that could be seen from the annex.

See also
List of forests in Israel

References

External links

maps (annotated in Hebrew)
Forest of the Martyrs in the Bezalel Narkiss Index of Jewish Art at the Center for Jewish Art, Hebrew University of Jerusalem

Monuments and memorials in Israel
Holocaust commemoration
Forests of Israel
Protected areas of Jerusalem District